Samuel Aaron Tannenbaum (1874–1948) was a literary scholar, bibliographer, and palaeographer, best known for his work on William Shakespeare and his contemporaries.

Life and career
Tannenbaum was born in Hungary, then part of the Austro-Hungarian Empire. He immigrated to the United States in 1886, the year he turned fourteen, and became a citizen in 1895. Graduating from the Columbia University College of Physicians and Surgeons in 1898, he pursued a career in psychotherapy, with a strong interest in  the work of Sigmund Freud. He was part of the circle of early Freud supporters that included Ernest Jones and Sándor Ferenczi, and was connected with early efforts to establish an English-language journal of psychotherapy. He published on medical and psychological subjects, including the books The Psychology of Accidents (1924) and The Patient's Dilemma (1935).

He was the editor of the Shakespeare Association Bulletin, and through the first half of the twentieth century produced a wide range of books and articles on Shakespeare and other figures of English Renaissance theatre and literature. Combining his two major areas of interest, psychology and Elizabethan literature, Tannenbaum was one of the first commentators to consider the nature of Shakespeare's sexuality from a Freudian perspective. He also published a major series of bibliographies on significant Elizabethan and Jacobean figures that were important scholarly resources in their era. His second wife, the former Dorothy Rosenzweig (married 1942), collaborated with him on some of his later publications.

As an amateur or self-taught palaeographer, Tannenbaum took positions and presented arguments on issues involving this area of Shakespeare studies, burgeoning at the time—though he often ended up on the side opposite the evolving scholarly and critical consensus. He was intensely skeptical of the view that Shakespeare contributed to the revision of the play Sir Thomas More, and argued against the work of Sir Edward Maunde Thompson and his collaborators. Tannenbaum also was deeply involved on the question of the forgeries of John Payne Collier. He believed the entire account book of the Office of the Master of the Revels was a Collier forgery—a view that has found no other defenders, though several other scholars, such as Charlotte Stopes, argued that the Revels accounts book was a partial forgery. He was also convinced that Simon Forman's  Book of Plays was a Collier forgery, a position that only a minority of commentators support.

Selected books
The Shakespeare Coat-of-Arms, 1908
The Booke of Sir Thomas Moore: A Bibliotic Study, 1927
Problems in Shakespeare's Penmanship, 1927
The Assassination of Christopher Marlowe, 1928
Shakespere Forgeries in the Revels Accounts, 1928
The Handwriting of the Renaissance, 1930
Shakespearian Scraps and Other Elizabethan Fragments, 1933
Christopher Marlowe, A Concise Bibliography, 1937
Shakespeare's "King Lear," A Concise Bibliography (Elizabethan Bibliographies, No. 16), 1940
John Webster, A Concise Bibliography (Elizabethan Bibliographies, No. 19), 1941
Michael Drayton, A Concise Bibliography (Elizabethan Bibliographies, No. 22), 1941
Sir Philip Sydney, A Concise Bibliography, 1941
Samuel Daniel, A Concise Bibliography, 1942
George Herbert, A Concise Bibliography, 1946 (with Dorothy Tannenbaum)

References 
 F. E. Halliday, A Shakespeare Companion 1564-1964, Baltimore, Penguin, 1964.

External links 

 

1874 births
1948 deaths
Columbia University Vagelos College of Physicians and Surgeons alumni
19th-century Hungarian people
20th-century Hungarian people
American palaeographers
American people of Hungarian-Jewish descent
Bibliographers
Hungarian Jews
Hungarian palaeographers
Jewish American writers
Shakespearean scholars
Austro-Hungarian emigrants to the United States